"Young & Free" is a song by Irish singer-songwriter and musician Dermot Kennedy. It was released as a single on 9 March 2018. The song features on his compilation album, Dermot Kennedy and EP Mike Dean Presents: Dermot Kennedy. The song peaked at number 82 on the Irish Singles Chart.

Background
The song was produced by Mike Dean. When talking about the song, Kennedy said, "Working with Mike Dean on this project was such an honour. 808s & Heartbreaks was one of my favourites from him, it was the perfect introduction for me to think about hip hop in a different way and play around with it. I just knew he'd get what I was trying to do with my sound… He put his stamp on the songs and was able to bring forward my love and appreciation for hip hop while keeping to its acoustic roots."

Music video
A music video to accompany the release of "Young & Free" was first released onto YouTube on 23 May 2018.

Personnel
Credits adapted from Tidal.
 Stephen Kozmeniuk – producer, composer, lyricist
 Dermot Kennedy – composer, lyricist
 Matty Green – mixer, studio personnel
 Carey Willetts – producer

Charts

Release history

References

2018 songs
2018 singles
Dermot Kennedy songs
Songs written by Stephen Kozmeniuk
Songs written by Carey Willetts